Redruth is an industrial suburb of Timaru, in the South Canterbury area and Canterbury region of New Zealand's South Island. It is located south of the town centre.

The suburb includes the Redruth Resource Recovery Park and landfill.

Saltwater Creek runs along the southern and eastern side of Redruth. Saltwater Creek Walkway is a track running in a loop around the creek and associated wetlands.

Demographics

Timaru East had a population of 273 at the 2018 New Zealand census, an increase of 15 people (5.8%) since the 2013 census, and a decrease of 27 people (-9.0%) since the 2006 census. There were 123 households. There were 150 males and 120 females, giving a sex ratio of 1.25 males per female. The median age was 40.1 years (compared with 37.4 years nationally), with 51 people (18.7%) aged under 15 years, 48 (17.6%) aged 15 to 29, 120 (44.0%) aged 30 to 64, and 51 (18.7%) aged 65 or older.

Ethnicities were 76.9% European/Pākehā, 14.3% Māori, 8.8% Pacific peoples, 13.2% Asian, and 2.2% other ethnicities (totals add to more than 100% since people could identify with multiple ethnicities).

The proportion of people born overseas was 26.4%, compared with 27.1% nationally.

Although some people objected to giving their religion, 46.2% had no religion, 33.0% were Christian, 1.1% were Hindu, 1.1% were Muslim, 2.2% were Buddhist and 4.4% had other religions.

Of those at least 15 years old, 30 (13.5%) people had a bachelor or higher degree, and 45 (20.3%) people had no formal qualifications. The median income was $27,400, compared with $31,800 nationally. 21 people (9.5%) earned over $70,000 compared to 17.2% nationally. The employment status of those at least 15 was that 108 (48.6%) people were employed full-time, 30 (13.5%) were part-time, and 12 (5.4%) were unemployed.

References

Suburbs of Timaru
Populated places in Canterbury, New Zealand